Parys Commando was a light infantry regiment of the South African Army. It formed part of the South African Army Infantry Formation as well as the South African Territorial Reserve.

History

Origin

With the UDF
This unit can trace its history to before the Union of South Africa in 1910.

By 1902 all Commando remnants were under British military control and disarmed.

By 1912, however previous Commando members could join shooting associations.

By 1940, such commandos were under control of the National Reserve of Volunteers.

These commandos were formally reactivated by 1948.

With the SADF
The commando was known as the Vredefort Commando up to 1967. This then changed to the North Free State Commando and this was finally changed in 1972 to the Parys Commando.

Freedom of the City
The unit received the Freedom of Parys in October 1980. At this function emphasis was laid on the protection of the town. The military donated an old Saxton tank to the unit in February 1985.

Higher Command
The unit fell under the command of Group 24 at Kroonstad.

Responsibility
The unit was responsible for the security of the farming areas around Parys and the nearby township Tumahole.

With the SANDF

Disbandment
This unit, along with all other Commando units was disbanded after a decision by South African President Thabo Mbeki to disband all Commando Units. The Commando system was phased out between 2003 and 2008 "because of the role it played in the apartheid era", according to the Minister of Safety and Security Charles Nqakula.

Leadership

Unit Insignia

References

See also 
 South African Commando System

Infantry regiments of South Africa
South African Commando Units